Quark/1 is a 1970 anthology of short stories and poetry edited by Samuel R. Delany and Marilyn Hacker. It is the first anthology in the Quark series.  The stories and poems are original to this anthology.

Contents
 Editorial, by Samuel R. Delany & Marilyn Hacker
 "The Cliff Climbers", by R. A. Lafferty
 "The Sound of Muzak", by Gardner R. Dozois
 "A Trip to the Head", by Ursula K. Le Guin
 "Let Us Quickly Hasten to the Gate of Ivory", by Thomas M. Disch
 "Inalienable Rite", by Gregory Benford
 "Orion", by George Stanley
 "The View from This Window", by Joanna Russ
 "Gone Are the Lupo", by H. B. Hickey
 "Fire Storm", by Christopher Priest
 "Getting to Know You", by Link
 "Dogman of Islington", by Hilary Bailey
 "Shades", by Sandy Boucher
 Twelve Ancillary Approximations for the Quark/ Cover Called Appomattox, by Russell FitzGerald
 "Carthing", by A. E. van Vogt
 "Daughter of Roses", by Helen Adam
 "Adrift on the Freeway", by Edward Bryant
 "My Father’s Guest", by Joan Bernott
 Critical Methods: Speculative Fiction, by Samuel R. Delany
 "Ramona, Come Softly", by Gordon Eklund
 Six Drawings, by Stephen Gilden
 Contributors’ Notes

References

1970 anthologies
Science fiction anthology series